John Connell Fulton (1890 – 8 November 1926) was a Scottish footballer who played as a left back, mainly for Morton over two spells.

He started his career at Abercorn, then played regularly for Morton for three seasons, attracting the attention of Everton who agreed a deal to sign him for cash and Jimmy Gourlay in May 1913. However, Fulton never made a first-team appearance in the English Football League and by the end of the same year was back in Scotland with Rangers, who finished runners-up in the 1913–14 Scottish Division One table, and then immediately sold Fulton back to Morton.

World War I soon broke out, and during the conflict Fulton served in the Scots Guards, attaining the rank of sergeant-major. His military commitments meant he rarely played for Morton (who were one of Scotland's strongest teams during the period) but remained contracted to them. In 1919, with the war at an end, Fulton was permitted to play for Morton's local rivals St Mirren, primarily in the 1919 Victory Cup due to an injury to Bernard Callaghan, and he was part of the team which brought the trophy to Paisley – his home town – with a win over Heart of Midlothian at Celtic Park.

Fulton retired as a footballer in 1923, becoming a local professional player and greenkeeper at Bushes Golf Club in Paisley. He died in an accident in November 1926 when he fell off a wall at his workplace, and the shotgun he was carrying for pest control on the course discharged, shooting him in the head. His son, also John, played for Queen of the South and Dumbarton in the 1940s.

References

1890 births
Date of birth missing
1926 deaths
Scottish footballers
Footballers from Paisley, Renfrewshire
Abercorn F.C. players
Everton F.C. players
Rangers F.C. players
Greenock Morton F.C. players
St Mirren F.C. players
Johnstone F.C. players
Scottish Junior Football Association players
Scottish Football League players
British Army personnel of World War I
Scots Guards soldiers
Accidental deaths in Scotland
Deaths by firearm in Scotland
Firearm accident victims
Neilston Victoria F.C. players
Association football fullbacks